Palomares del Campo is a municipality in Cuenca, Castile-La Mancha, Spain. In 2017, it had a population of 642.

Municipalities in the Province of Cuenca